Come to Daddy is an EP/mini-album by British electronic music artist Aphex Twin. The EP's lead single, and the first track on the EP, "Come to Daddy (Pappy Mix)"—often simply called "Come to Daddy"—is one of Aphex Twin's best-known songs; it peaked at number 36 on the UK Singles Chart.

Composition
Come to Daddy has been described as featuring drum and bass beats throughout. Each mix of "Come to Daddy" is seemingly unrelated, with the "Little Lord Faulteroy" and "Mummy" mixes bearing no noticeable resemblance to the original "Pappy" mix. "To Cure a Weakling Child (Contour Regard)" is a remix of the song "To Cure a Weakling Child" from Richard D. James Album. Six of Come to Daddy eight tracks feature vocals.

According to Sean Booth of Autechre, James' track "Bucephalus Bouncing Ball" is a reaction to their track "Drane", to which they then replied with the track "Drane2".

Packaging
Come to Daddy packaging features stark black letters against a white background. All the information, track listings and lyrics are printed the same way, and only two images are present, both photographed by Stefan DeBatselier and digitally altered by Chris Cunningham, using James' face on children. James has used his likeness as the artwork on five of his releases: The ...I Care Because You Do and Richard D. James Album albums, Donkey Rhubarb, Come to Daddy and the "Windowlicker" single.

The cover of the out-of-print second CD, with its white lettering against an orange background, makes reference to the fact that "To Cure a Weakling Child" had been used in a television advertisement for Orange. However, the advertisement used an edit of the album version, whilst the version that appears on the EP is the radically different "Contour Regard" mix.

Track listing
All tracks written, produced and engineered by Richard D. James.

All vinyl editions of Come to Daddy (excluding a promotional double LP limited to 500 copies) exclude tracks 5–8.

The tracks were originally released on two separate CDs, WAP94CD and WAP94CDR, with the first four tracks on the former and the rest on the latter. These have since been deleted and replaced by one EP containing all eight tracks (WAP94CDX).

Personnel
Aphex Twin – vocals, keyboards, synthesizers, piano, drum machine, percussion
Chris Cunningham – images
Stefan de Batselier – photography

Charts

Certifications

References

External links
 Come To Daddy at the Warp Records website
 "Come To Daddy" at the unofficial Chris Cunningham website
 The "Come To Daddy" video

1997 EPs
Aphex Twin EPs
Sire Records EPs
Warp (record label) EPs